Liam Thomas Noble (born 8 May 1991) is an English professional footballer who plays as a midfielder for Morpeth Town. He has formerly played for Hartlepool United, Forest Green Rovers, Notts County, Carlisle United and Sunderland.

Club career

Early career
Noble rose through the academy at Sunderland and entered the reserve team in 2009–10, whilst continuing to impress for Kevin Ball's youth side.

Carlisle United (loan)
Taken in on loan at League One side Carlisle United in January 2011, he made his debut for the club in a 4–0 win over Bristol Rovers on 15 January. After his loan deal was extended until the end of the season, he won his first league start on 22 January, helping Carlisle to a 1–0 win over at Notts County at Meadow Lane.

His impressive performances for the Cumbrians impressed manager Greg Abbott enough to take Noble on a six-month loan deal. He joined them permanently on 12 January 2012

Notts County
On 3 June 2014, Noble joined Notts County on a two-year on a free transfer following his release by Carlisle United.

On 11 August 2015, he scored a brace in a 2–1 upset win at Championship side Huddersfield Town in the first round of the League Cup, after Notts had been trailing 0–1.

Forest Green Rovers
In June 2016, Noble signed for National League club Forest Green Rovers on a two-year contract. He made his debut for the club on 16 August 2016 in a 1–0 away win at Woking where he provided the assist for the winning goal. He scored his first goal for the club on 3 September 2016 in a 2–1 away win against Chester.

On 14 May 2017, he captained Forest Green to promotion to the Football League for the first time in the club's history in the 2016–17 National League play-off final at Wembley Stadium with a 3–1 win over Tranmere Rovers.

In October 2017, Noble was released by Forest Green Rovers.

Notts County
In October 2017, Noble signed for a second spell at Notts County on an 18 Month contract starting on 1 January 2018.
On 30 June 2018, Noble left Notts County by mutual consent. He made 18 league appearances for the League Two side, scoring once.

Hartlepool United
Following his release from Notts County, Noble signed for National League club Hartlepool United becoming the club's fifth signing of the season. Noble scored on his debut for Pools in a 1–1 draw against Maidstone United in August 2018. Noble finished the 2018–19 season as the club's top scorer, scoring 13 goals in 44 appearances while also providing nine assists. In May 2019, Noble signed a new contract to keep him at the club for the 2019–20 season.

Career statistics

Club

Honours

Club
Carlisle United
Football League Trophy: 2011
Forest Green Rovers
National League play-off winner: 2016–17

References

External links

1991 births
Living people
Footballers from Newcastle upon Tyne
English footballers
Association football midfielders
Sunderland A.F.C. players
Carlisle United F.C. players
Notts County F.C. players
Forest Green Rovers F.C. players
English Football League players
Hartlepool United F.C. players
Morpeth Town A.F.C. players